Franklin John Shuter (17 June 1943 – 12 July 1997) was a New Zealand speedway rider who rode with, and was League Champion with each of the Swindon Robins, the Poole Pirates and the Exeter Falcons in the British League.

Career summary
Shuter began riding at the Templeton Speedway in Christchurch in 1963. He moved to England in 1965 and joined the Swindon Robins. In 1969 he was transferred to the Poole Pirates. In late 1970 he returned to New Zealand and had a break from speedway for a year. Shuter won the New Zealand Championship in 1971. He returned to England in 1972 and rode for Poole again. The following year he was transferred to the Exeter Falcons. When Exeter won the League Championship in 1974 he became the first rider to win three league medals with different clubs. He retired from riding in the British League at the end of 1974 and moved to Israel. While living there he rode for a Rest of the World team v. U.S.A. in March 1976. He then moved to California to ride for the LA Sprockets in the American League. He was injured in a track accident and retired from speedway in May 1976.

In the late 1970s he established an engineering machining business called All Right Machining in Los Angeles which worked on engines and transmissions for aircraft companies. He later moved the business to Hemet, and in 1996 he sold it to the Stillen Company.  He died in a traffic accident on 12 July 1997.

References 

1943 births
1997 deaths
New Zealand speedway riders
Sportspeople from Christchurch
Swindon Robins riders
Poole Pirates riders
Exeter Falcons riders